Rajkummar Rao (born Raj Kumar Yadav; 31 August 1984) is an Indian  actor known for his work in Hindi films. He has appeared in more than 30 films since 2010, and is the recipient of several accolades including a National Film Award, three Filmfare Awards and an Asia Pacific Screen Award. In 2017, he appeared on Forbes Indias Celebrity 100 list.

After studying acting at the Film and Television Institute of India, Rao made his acting debut with the anthology film Love Sex Aur Dhokha (2010) and took on supporting roles in the films Gangs of Wasseypur – Part 2 and Talaash: The Answer Lies Within (both 2012). He had his breakthrough in 2013 with critically acclaimed performances in the dramas Kai Po Che! and Shahid. His portrayal of lawyer Shahid Azmi in the latter won him the National Film Award for Best Actor and the Filmfare Award for Best Actor (Critics).

Rao's career progressed with supporting roles in the films Queen (2014), Aligarh (2015), and Bareilly Ki Barfi (2017), with the latter winning him the Filmfare Award for Best Supporting Actor. He starred in lead roles in the independent films Trapped (2016) and Newton (2017), with the former winning him his second Filmfare Award for Best Actor (Critics) and the latter earning him the Asia Pacific Screen Award for Best Performance by an Actor. Rao had his highest-grossing release in the horror comedy Stree (2018), and he had his first English film role in The White Tiger (2021). He also gained praise for his performances in the films Ludo (2020), Badhaai Do and Monica, O My Darling (both 2022).

Early and personal life 
Rajkummar Rao was born as Raj Kumar Yadav on 31 August 1984 in Prem Nagar, Gurgaon, Haryana, India. He had two older siblings and three cousins in his extended family. His father, Satya Prakash Yadav, was a government employee in the Haryana revenue department, and his mother, Kamlesh Yadav, a homemaker. His mother and father died in 2016 and 2019 respectively. He completed his 12th standard from S.N. Sidheshwar Senior. Sec Public School, where he participated in school plays. He graduated from The Atma Ram Sanatan Dharma College, (University of Delhi) where he was simultaneously doing theatre with Kshitij Theatre Group  and the Shri Ram Centre in Delhi.

Rao said that he decided to become an actor after seeing Manoj Bajpayee and being "highly influenced" by his performance. In 2008, he enrolled in a two-year acting course at the Film and Television Institute of India (FTII), Pune, and moved to Mumbai to pursue a film career. Rao is a vegetarian. He changed his surname to Rao from Yadav in 2014 and also added an extra 'm' to his name. He said the reason for this was, "Rao or Yadav, I can use either of the surnames as both are family names. As far as the double 'm' in the first name is concerned, it's for my mother. She believes in numerology." He is formally trained in taekwondo.

Rao had been in a relationship with actress Patralekha Paul since 2010. He married her on 15 November 2021 in Chandigarh.

Career

Early work (2010–2012) 
After graduating from the FTII in 2008, Rao spent the next year visiting studios and meeting casting directors. He made a small, uncredited appearance as a news reader in Ram Gopal Varma's 2010 political thriller Rann. After reading in a newspaper advertisement that mentioned Dibakar Banerjee was looking for newcomers for his found footage anthology film Love Sex Aur Dhokha (2010), he auditioned for the film and was selected. The film consists of three stories; Rao appears in the second story opposite Neha Chauhan. He played Adarsh, a supermarket supervisor who cons an employee into sleeping with him so he can record the act on a hidden camera and sell it. To fit the part, he had to lose  in a month. The film and Rao's performance met with critical acclaim. It also turned out to be a profitable box-office venture.

After the success of his debut film, producer Ekta Kapoor offered Rao the lead role in the found footage horror film Ragini MMS (2011). He was reluctant initially to accept it, as it seemed similar to his previous work, but he took up the offer at casting director Atul Mongia's insistence. Despite an unfavorable critical response, the film was a box-office success. His next release was Bejoy Nambiar's crime thriller Shaitan (2011), in which he played a slimy police officer. Raja Sen, who was critical of the film, praised Rao's performance by calling him "reliably terrific".

Director Anurag Kashyap had liked Rao's performance in Love Sex Aur Dhokha and cast him in Gangs of Wasseypur – Part 2 (2012), a followup to his crime film Gangs of Wasseypur – Part 1. He played the supporting role of Shamshad Alam for which he visited Wasseypur to perfect his accent and character. The film was a critical and financial success. His subsequent role was that of independence activist Lokenath Bal in Bedabrata Pain's historical drama Chittagong (2012), which was based on the Chittagong armoury raid. His final release of the year was Reema Kagti's suspense thriller Talaash: The Answer Lies Within, where he played a cop. The film, starring Aamir Khan, Rani Mukerji, Kareena Kapoor, Nawazuddin Siddiqui and Shernaz Patel, had worldwide earnings of over ₹1.74 billion (US$24 million) to emerge as the year's eighth highest-grossing Hindi film. Rajeev Masand commented that in just one scene Rao shows "what a good actor can bring even to a small part".

Breakthrough (2013–2016) 

Abhishek Kapoor's social drama film Kai Po Che! (2013) was Rao's first venture in 2013. Co-starring Sushant Singh Rajput and Amit Sadh, the film is based on Chetan Bhagat's 2008 novel The 3 Mistakes of My Life. The film was released in India on 22 February 2013 and received critical acclaim, with praise for the lead performances. Shilpa Jamkhandikar of Deccan Herald felt that Rao stood out and played off the role "beautifully". Rao received his first nomination for the Filmfare Award for Best Supporting Actor for his performance in the film.

In 2013, he also appeared in the Hansal Mehta-directed biographical drama Shahid, where he plays the title role of late lawyer Shahid Azmi. To prepare for the role, Rao met Azmi's family and spent time with them to understand the man and his personality. He also studied the Quran and attended courtrooms to understand how lawyers behave. Rao said he was "emotionally drained" as the character was challenging and complex. The film and his performance met with critical acclaim upon its release. Anupama Chopra called the film Rao's "triumph"; "His Shahid has strength, anguish and a controlled anger, but also real charm." The film was also a box-office success; Rao received the National Film Award for Best Actor at the 61st National Film Awards ceremony and his first Filmfare Award for Best Actor (Critics) at the 59th Filmfare Awards. His other 2013 release was the comedy film Boyss Toh Boyss Hain.

In 2013, Rao played the supporting role of a manipulative fiancé in the comedy-drama Queen. The film had its world premiere at the Busan International Film Festival and was released theatrically in India on 7 March 2014. It was a critical and commercial success, grossing ₹970 million (US$14 million) worldwide. Saibal Chatterjee of NDTV noted that Rao "brings remarkable restraint to bear upon his interpretation of the disgustingly conservative city slicker who cannot see beyond his nose".

The same year, he acted in a short film titled Bombay Mirror directed by Shlok Sharma along with Vijay Maurya. He collaborated with Mehta on his drama film CityLights (2014). Co-starring Patralekha Paul, the film tells the story of a poor farm family from Rajasthan that comes to Mumbai in search of a livelihood. To prepare for the role, Rao lived in the small town of Sadri in the Pali district of Rajasthan for a month, grew a moustache and became well-versed with the dialect. Critics praised the film and Rao's performance. Sweta Kaushal of Hindustan Times writing that he slips "effortlessly" into the role. It proved to be a moderate financial success.

In 2015, Rao appeared in a supporting role in the romantic comedy Dolly Ki Doli, co-starring Sonam K Ahuja, Pulkit Samrat and Varun Sharma. It met with mixed reviews and had only an average gross at the box-office. Its followup was the Mohit Suri-directed romantic drama Hamari Adhuri Kahani (2015), where he plays an abusive husband to Vasudha Prasad (played by Vidya Balan). He returned to work with Mehta in the biographical drama Aligarh. Based on the life of Professor Ramchandra Siras, Manoj Bajpayee has the lead role, while Rao plays a journalist who tries to dig up the story. Aligarh met with critical acclaim upon its release, with particular praise for Bajpayee and Rao's performances. Sukanya Verma called Rao "pitch-perfect" in his role of "inquisitive journalist". Rao received his second nomination for the Filmfare Award for Best Supporting Actor for his performance in the film.

Rao collaborated with Vikramaditya Motwane for his directorial venture, the survival drama Trapped (2016). It tells the story of a man trapped in his apartment without food, water and electricity for days. Rao found the role of Shaurya to be one of his most challenging to date. He had to lose weight and to maintain it remained on a carrot and coffee diet throughout the course of filming. Despite being a vegan, Rao ate meat in some scenes for the first time in his life, as Motwane insisted on realism. Trapped premiere at the 2016 Mumbai Film Festival and was released theatrically on 17 March 2017 to positive reviews. Subhash K. Jha wrote that Rao "immerses himself in the judiciously assembled plot with such radiant authenticity that after a while we cease to watch the skill that underlines the outstanding performance". Rao won his second Filmfare Award for Best Actor (Critics) for his performance in the film.

Commercial success (2017–2018) 

Rao's first release in 2017 was the romantic comedy Behen Hogi Teri with Shruti Haasan; it met with an unfavorable critical response though critics praised Rao's performance. He followed this with another romantic comedy titled Bareilly Ki Barfi, directed by Ashwiny Iyer Tiwari and co-starring Kriti Sanon and Ayushmann Khurrana. The film and Rao's performance met with widespread critical acclaim. Namrata Joshi wrote: "Rao is a hoot and brings the house down with his chameleon turn and comic timing – simpering simpleton one minute, full of swagger the next; a role that could have become a caricature in the hands of a lesser actor." The film was a commercial success and Rao won his first Filmfare Award for Best Supporting Actor for his performance in the film.

Amit V. Masurkar's black comedy Newton was Rao's next film. In it, he plays the role of an upright government clerk sent on election duty to a Naxal-controlled town. He asked the director if he could curl his hair and blink his eyes continuously to make the character distinct; Masurkar agreed. The film premiered at the 67th Berlin International Film Festival and was released in India on 22 September 2017. Newton met with critical acclaim as did Rao's performance. Rajeev Masand commented, "It's hard to separate the actor from the character, and not many of our artistes can claim to possess that gift." The role earned him the Asia Pacific Screen Award for Best Actor and his third nomination for the Filmfare Award for Best Actor (Critics). He also made a cameo appearance in Dinesh Vijan's Raabta (2017). He had to apply prosthetics for five to six hours every day to look like a 324-year-old man.

His final theatrical release of the year was Shaadi Mein Zaroor Aana with Kriti Kharbanda, which met with mixed critical response. He also made his digital debut with ALTBalaji's historical biographical web mini-series Bose: Dead/Alive. Based on the 2012 book India's Biggest Cover-up by Anuj Dhar, he portrays nationalist leader Subhash Chandra Bose. For the role, Rao gained  and went half bald. Anvita Singh of India Today felt it was not Rao's best performance, but because of his skill as an actor he "does grab your attention".

Rao reunited with Mehta for the biographical crime film Omerta, where he portrays the role of terrorist Ahmed Omar Saeed Sheikh. To prepare for the role, Rao watched several videos, documentaries and hate speeches by Sheikh to "gather a lot of hatred and anger" inside himself. He said he was "disturbed" while shooting the film because of the character he was portraying and called it "easily the toughest character" he has played until then. The film had its world premier at the 2017 Toronto International Film Festival and was released in India on 4 May 2018. The film and Rao's performance met with critical acclaim, with Saibal Chatterjee of NDTV calling it a "pitch-perfect performance".

He starred next in the musical comedy Fanney Khan (2018) with Aishwarya Rai Bachchan and Anil Kapoor. A remake of the 2000 Belgian film Everybody's Famous!, the film was a critical and commercial failure. Stree (2018), the Amar Kaushik-directed horror comedy was his next release. Based on the Bangalore urban legend known as Nale Ba, the film also starred Shraddha Kapoor. The film, and Rao's performance, met with positive critical feedback. Rachit Gupta of The Times of India noted that Rao "handles the many shades of comedy, horror and romance with great ease". It also earned him his first nomination for the Filmfare Award for Best Actor. Stree was a major financial success. In the same year Rao appeared briefly in Tabrez Noorani's Love Sonia which was about sex trafficking. His final release of 2018 was 5 Weddings.

2019–present 
Ek Ladki Ko Dekha Toh Aisa Laga (2019), a film about a closeted lesbian, was Rao's first film of 2019. Co-starring Sonam K Ahuja, Anil Kapoor and Juhi Chawla, critics received the film warmly for its positive representation of homosexuality. However, it failed to do well commercially. He appeared next with Kangana Ranaut in the black comedy Judgementall Hai Kya. His performance earned him his fourth nomination for the Filmfare Award for Best Actor (Critics). His final acting venture was Mikhil Musale's comedy flick Made in China where he plays a Gujarati businessman who receives a proposal to market a Chinese aphrodisiac in India. The film, based on the namesake novel by Parinda Joshi, met with mixed critical response. Anna M. M. Vetticad, who was critical of the film, praised Rao: "The best thing about it are Rao and [Boman] Irani who are a pleasure to watch even in this middling affair." The film fared moderately well at the box-office.

Rao's first release of 2020 was Ramesh Sippy's romantic comedy Shimla Mirchi, which had been delayed for several years. It met with negative reviews from critics and was a box office disaster. His next acting venture, the Anurag Basu-directed anthology film Ludo also featuring an ensemble cast of Abhishek Bachchan, Aditya Roy Kapur, Sanya Malhotra, Fatima Sana Shaikh and Pankaj Tripathi, was directly streamed digitally on Netflix due to COVID-19 pandemic. Anupama Chopra called him one of the "standouts" of the film and wrote: "There is such sweetness in his longing. Of course, Alloo is an emotional fool but Rajkummar doesn't play him for laughs." The film earned him his second nomination for the Filmfare Award for Best Actor and his fifth nomination for the Filmfare Award for Best Actor (Critics). The same year, he also reunited with Mehta for the sports comedy Chhalaang to play a Haryanvi physical instructor. In which he was paired opposite Nushrat Bharucha. It was premiered on Amazon Prime Video.

In 2021, Rao made his Hollywood debut with Ramin Bahrani's The White Tiger, which was based on the eponymous novel by Aravind Adiga. Co-starring Priyanka Chopra and Adarsh Gourav, the film started streaming on Netflix on 22 January and met with positive critical reception. David Rooney from The Hollywood Reporter noted that Rao "deftly balances a Western-schooled urge to tell himself he's a fair-minded man with the unmistakable air of privileged entitlement." His subsequent release was the horror-comedy Roohi co-starring Janhvi Kapoor. The second installment in Dinesh Vijan's horror-comedy universe, the first being Stree, the film met with mixed critical feedback and was a box office failure.

As of January 2021, he has started shooting with Bhumi Pednekar for Badhaai Do, a spiritual sequel to the 2018 comedy-drama Badhaai Ho. He has wrapped up filming for the Hindi remake of the 2020 Telugu thriller HIT: The First Case. Rao reunited with Kriti Sanon in the comedy drama film Hum Do Hamare Do (2021).

Public image 
Forbes India featured Rao in their 30 Under 30 list of 2014. People for the Ethical Treatment of Animals (PETA) listed him as India's Hottest Vegetarian Celebrity in 2017. The same year, he appeared on Forbes Indias Celebrity 100 list and GQ magazine's list of 50 Most Influential Young Indians. He has served as the brand ambassador for Actimaxx, Seventh Street and Food Safety and Standards Authority of India's eat right movement.

Rao donated an undisclosed amount of money to the PM CARES Fund, the Maharashtra Chief Minister's Relief Fund and Zomato's Feeding India to help feed families in need because of the COVID-19 pandemic in India.

Filmography

Awards and nominations

References

External links 

 

1984 births
Best Actor National Film Award winners
Film and Television Institute of India alumni
Indian male film actors
Living people
Male actors from Haryana
Male actors in Hindi cinema
People from Gurgaon
Delhi University alumni
Filmfare Awards winners
Screen Awards winners
Zee Cine Awards winners
Asia Pacific Screen Award winners